The following Confederate Army units and commanders were the initial structure on April 30, 1862 of the Confederate Army of Northern Virginia during the Peninsula campaign of the American Civil War. It contains units throughout Virginia that influenced the campaign. The Union order of battle is listed separately.

Abbreviations used

Military rank
 Gen = General
 MG = Major General
 BG = Brigadier General
 Col = Colonel
 Ltc = Lieutenant Colonel
 Maj = Major
 Cpt = Captain
 Lt = Lieutenant

Army of Northern Virginia

The following organization of the Army of Northern Virginia on the Peninsula was established on April 30. Prior to this organization, Confederate forces were organized ad hoc, as they arrived in theater. The divisions were grouped by their place in the Warwick Line.

Gen Joseph E. Johnston, Commanding
    Maj Thomas G. Rhett, Adjutant and Chief of Staff

Staff:
 Maj A. Pendleton Mason, Assistant Adjutant
 Ltc Walter H. Stevens, Chief Engineer
 Maj E. Porter Alexander, Chief of Ordnance
 Maj Archibald H. Cole, Quartermaster
 Maj Robert G. Cole, Chief Commissary
 Dr. Samuel Choppin, Chief Surgeon
 Lt James B. Washington, aide-de-camp

Right of Position (Army of the Peninsula)
Even after its absorption into the Army of Northern Virginia, Magruder continued to style his command the "Army of the Peninsula." It was assigned responsibility for the section of the line from the James River to Dam No. 1.

MG John B. Magruder, Commanding
  Cpt Henry Bryan, Adjutant

Both brigades of Toombs' Division and Griffith's Brigade and Kershaw's Brigade from McLaws' Division were old Army of the Potomac units that had been transferred to reinforce the Warwick Line. Magruder had organized his army only in two very large divisions under McLaws and Rains, and several additional regional commands. Upon the arrival of Johnston, he reorganized the divisions into four brigades, two of which, Cobb's and McLaws', remained under his direct command. The reserve brigade and forces at Williamsburg are both also from the old Army of the Peninsula. The 17th Mississippi was stationed at Leesburg and the 24th Georgia in Goldsboro, until they became early reinforcements for Magruder.

Center of Position
The center was the area between Dam No. 1 and Redoubts 4 and 5 outside Yorktown

MG James Longstreet, Commanding
  Cpt Moxley Sorrel, Adjutant

Colston's Brigade was the First Brigade of the Department of Norfolk, then briefly served as part of the Army of the Peninsula, before being transferred to Longstreet's command at the end of April. Pryor's Brigade was a new organization, made up of troops from the old Army of the Peninsula plus the 14th Alabama, detached from the Department of Aquia in the winter to recover from disease in Richmond. The other brigades are from the old Army of the Potomac.

Left of Position
The responsibility of the left was at Yorktown, extending to Redoubts 4 and 5. Rains' Brigade was stationed within Yorktown itself, giving him direct command over the defensive batteries present there.

MG Daniel Harvey Hill, Commanding
  Cpt James W. Ratchford, Adjutant

Rains' Brigade, the reserve detachment for Early's Division, and the units at Glouscester Point were all part of the old Army of the Peninsula. Early's, Rodes', and Featherston's Brigades were from the old Army of the Potomac.

Reserve
The reserve consisted of troops from the District of Aquia, which Smith had assumed command of from Theophilus Holmes on March 23. Smith left a single brigade under Charles W. Field in the District and brought the rest to the Peninsula.

MG Gustavus W. Smith, commanding
  Cpt John W. Riely, adjutant

Cavalry and artillery reserves

Other troops in the Department of Northern Virginia
These troops helped shape the theater for the Peninsula campaign.

Huger's division (Department of Norfolk)
The bulk of troops from the Department of Norfolk were formally folded into the Department of Northern Virginia at the beginning of April, but Huger continued to refer to his command by its former name.

BG Benjamin Huger, commanding

Huger had not completed brigading his regiments at the beginning of the campaign. Additionally, significant portions of what would become Armistead's Brigade and Blanchard's Brigade were out of theater in Richmond or North Carolina. The 12th North Carolina would be detached to join a brigade fresh from North Carolina under Lawrence O'Bryan Branch for an aborted attempt to reinforce Jackson in the Valley. They would instead be moved to outside Richmond where they would take part in the Battle of Hanover Court-House.

Aquia District
MG Gustavus W. Smith, Commanding
(absent with the Army of Northern Virginia)

Troops around Gordonsville
Johnston had detached Ewell to maintain communication with Jackson. Ewell nominally reported to D.H. Hill, but was actually operating semi-independently. On May 17, Johnston would transfer the division to the Valley District under Jackson.

MG Richard S. Ewell

District of the Valley
MG Stonewall Jackson, Commanding
    Maj Robert L. Dabney, Adjutant

Staff:
 Lt A.S. "Sandie" Pendleton, Assistant Adjutant General
 Maj Abner Smead, Inspector General
 Maj Daniel Truehart, Chief of Artillery
 Lt James M. Garnett, Ordnance Officer
 Lt James K. Boswell, Engineer
 Mr. Jedediah Hotchkiss, Topographical Engineer
 Maj John A. Harmon, Quartermaster
 Dr. Hunter McGuire, Chief Surgeon
 Maj Wells J. Hawks, Commissary
 Col William Lowther Jackson, aide-de-camp
 Col Charles J. Faulkner, aide-de-camp
 Lt George G. Junkin, aide-de-camp
 Lt Henry Kyd Douglas, aide-de-camp

References
 Organization of the Army of Northern Virginia, commanded by General Joseph E. Johnston, on the Peninsula, about April 30, 1862 The War of the Rebellion: A Compilation of the Official Records of the Union and Confederate Armies. United States War Department.  Series I, Volume XI, Chapter XXIII, pp. 479–484.  (1884)
 Organization of the Troops of the Department of the Peninsula, commanded by Maj. Gen. J. Bankhead Magruder, C.S. Army, January 31, 1862 The War of the Rebellion: A Compilation of the Official Records of the Union and Confederate Armies. United States War Department.  Series I, Volume IX, Chapter XIX, pp. 37.  (1883)
 
 
 

American Civil War orders of battle